Production methods fall into three main categories: job (one-off production), batch (multiple items, one step at a time for all items), and flow

Job production 

Job production is used when a product is produced with the labor of one or few workers and is rarely used for bulk and large scale production. It is mainly used for one-off products or prototypes (hence also known as Prototype Production), as it is inefficient; however, quality is greatly enhanced with job production compared to other methods. Individual wedding cakes and made-to-measure suits are examples of job production. New small firms often use job production before they get a chance or have the means to expand. Job Production is highly motivating for workers because it gives the workers an opportunity to produce the whole product and take pride in it.

Batch production 

Batch production is the method used to produce or process any product of the groups or batches where the products in the batch go through the whole production process together. An example would be when a bakery produces each different type of bread separately and each product (in this case, bread) is not produced continuously. Batch production is used in many different ways and is most suited to when there is a need for a quality/quantity balance. This technique is probably the most commonly used method for organizing manufacture and promotes specialist labor, as very often batch production involves a small number of persons. Batch production occurs when many similar items are produced together. Each batch goes through one stage of the production before moving onto the next stage.

Flow production 

Flow production (mass production) is also a very common method of production. Flow production is when the product is built up through many segregated stages; the product is built upon at each stage and then passed directly to the next stage where it is built upon again. The production method is financially the most efficient and effective because there is less of a need for skilled workers.

Lean Production 

Contrary to job production, the method Boutique Manufacturing (Lean) is suitable for the production of very small to small batches, i.e. orders of a few units up to several dozens of similar or equal goods. The workflow organization of a Boutique Manufacturing entity can be a mixture of both jobbing and batch production but involves higher standardization than job production. Boutique Manufacturing is often organized with single workplaces or production cells carrying out a number of subsequent production steps until completion of certain components or even the whole product; large assembly lines are generally not used. The flexibility and variety of products able to be produced in the entity therefore are much higher than with the more standardized method of batch production.

See also 
 Computer Aided Design
 Computer Aided Manufacture
 Processing mode

External links 
 Methods of Production

Production and manufacturing